M.T. v J.T., 140 N.J. 77, 355 A.2d 204, 205 (NJ Super. Ct. 1976), is a 1976 New Jersey Superior Court case which affirmed the validity of a marriage of a trans woman to a man, and in particular legally recognized the woman's post-operative gender of the plaintiff. This case is considered to be the first legal case which specifically addresses transsexual marriage.

In 1972, M.T. filed the lawsuit claiming spousal support after her husband of two years, J.T., abandoned her and ceased providing financial support. A three-judge panel of the Superior Court's Appellate Division affirmed the holding of the lower court that M.T. was female for the purposes of New Jersey law at the time of the marriage, and therefore the marriage was valid, and that M.T. was entitled to support. This opinion based its reasoning in part on the fact that M.T. had undergone sexual reassignment surgery. The court considered, but rejected, the arguments of the earlier English case Corbett v Corbett, which had ruled that English marriage laws follow birth sex.

See also
 Void marriage

References

External links
 Court Decision

1976 in LGBT history
1976 in New Jersey
1976 in United States case law
LGBT history in New Jersey
New Jersey state case law
Same-sex marriage law in the United States
Transgender marriage
United States family case law
United States transgender rights case law